Untung Suropati Stadium is a football stadium in Pasuruan Regency, East Java, Indonesia. The stadium has a capacity of 5,000 people.

It is the home base of Persekap Pasuruan.

References

Pasuruan Regency
Sports venues in Indonesia
Football venues in Indonesia
Multi-purpose stadiums in Indonesia